Seyed Javad Miri Meynagh (born 1971) is a Swedish-Iranian sociologist and associate professor of sociology at the Institute for Humanities and Cultural Studies.
He is known for his expertise on social theory and Islamic thinkers.

Books
 Islamism and Post-Islamism: Reflections upon Allama Jafari’s Political Thought, University Press of America, 2014
 Reimagining Malcolm X: Street Thinker versus Academic Thinker, University Press of America, 2015
 East and West: Allama Jafari on Bertrand Russell, University Press of America, 2013

Edited
 Orientalism: A Eurocentric Vision of the ‘Other’, International Peace Studies Center Press, 2013
 Reclaiming the Sane Society: Essays on Erich Fromm’s Thought, edited by Seyed Javad Miri, Robert Lake and Tricia M. Kress, Sense Publishers, 2014
 Malcolm X: From Political Eschatology to Religious Revolutionary, edited by Dustin J. Byrd and Seyed Javad Miri, Brill, 2016
 Ali Shariati and the Future of Social Theory: Religion, Revolution, and the Role of the Intellectual, edited by Dustin J. Byrd and Seyed Javad Miri, Brill, 2017
 Frantz Fanon and Social Theory: A View from the Wretched, edited by Dustin J. Byrd and Seyed Javad Miri, Brill, 2019

References

External links
Seyed Javad Miri at IHCS

Iranian sociologists
1971 births
Living people
Philosophers of social science
Alumni of the University of Bristol
Academic staff of the Institute for Humanities and Cultural Studies
Swedish sociologists
University of Gothenburg alumni
Sociologists of religion